Carol Jean Liu (born September 12, 1941) is an American politician who is a former member member of the California State Senate. A Democrat, she represented Senate District 25, which includes portions of the San Fernando and San Gabriel Valleys.

Before being elected to the State Senate, Liu served in the State Assembly representing the 44th Assembly District until 2006. In 2008, Liu was elected to succeed the termed-out Jack Scott in the State Senate.

Early life and career
Liu was born in 1941 in Berkeley, California. Her mother was a fourth generation Californian, and her father was a Chinese immigrant. Liu graduated from San Jose State College with a B.A. in 1963. Liu taught junior high and senior high school-level history in the San Francisco Bay Area cities of Richmond and El Cerrito, California from 1964 until 1978. She also served as executive director of the Richmond Federation of Teachers from 1975 to 1978. In 1982, Liu completed a teaching and administrative credential at the University of California, Berkeley.

Political career
Before serving in the Senate, Liu served in the State Assembly.  Prior to the Assembly, Liu served on the city council of La Cañada Flintridge, a small city in the Cresenta Valley near Pasadena, from 1992 until 2000, including two terms as its mayor.

In the 2008 primary election for the California Senate seat, she initially faced opposition from former Assembly Majority Leader Dario Frommer. However, Frommer decided to drop out before the election.

Legislation
Among her major accomplishments in the Senate has been the enactment of Senate Bill 110, the Crime Victims with Disabilities Act of 2010. Passed unanimously by the Legislature and signed into law by Governor Arnold Schwarzenegger, the bill assures that abuse and neglect of people with disabilities and elders are treated as crimes.

Senator Liu's SB 42 (2015) – Postsecondary Education Goals bill coordinates California's Higher Education segments (U.C. and C.S.U.), but it was vetoed by Governor Jerry Brown.

Senator Liu voted in favor of California Senate Constitutional Amendment No.5. The proposed bill would have asked California voters to consider repealing provisions of Proposition 209, thus permitting state universities to consider an applicant's race, ethnicity or national origin in making admissions decisions.  The proposed amendment resulted in controversy. In a Facebook response, Liu indicated that California Proposition 209 set "outdated barriers" to groups of "underrepresented students eligible for U.C. and C.S.U." and that their enrollment "has not kept pace with the proportion of the high school graduating class they now represent."  Senator Liu, along with former senators Leland Yee and Ted Lieu, who had also voted for the bill, ultimately issued a joint statement calling for the bill to be withheld pending further consultations with the "affected communities."

Personal life
Liu is married to Michael Peevey, who was appointed to the California Public Utilities Commission by Governor Gray Davis, and later was named president of the Commission by Governor Arnold Schwarzenegger, where he served until retiring in 2014.

They have three children and four grandchildren.

References

External links

California Archive Carol Liu
Join California Carol Liu

Democratic Party California state senators
Politicians from Greater Los Angeles
Women state legislators in California
1941 births
Living people
American mayors of Chinese descent
California politicians of Chinese descent
American school administrators
Schoolteachers from California
American women educators
American women of Chinese descent in politics
Women mayors of places in California
California city council members
Women city councillors in California
Mayors of places in California
Democratic Party members of the California State Assembly
People from La Cañada Flintridge, California
Politicians from Berkeley, California
Politicians from Oakland, California
San Jose State University alumni
University of California, Berkeley alumni
University of California, Berkeley faculty
21st-century American politicians
21st-century American women politicians
Asian-American city council members